Nada Milošević-Đorđević (Serbian Cyrillic: Нада Милошевић-Ђорђевић; 2 December 1934 – 27 July 2021) was a Serbian literary historian and professor in the Faculty of Philology at the University of Belgrade. 

She was born in the then Kingdom of Yugoslavia. She was a corresponding member of the Serbian Academy of Sciences and Arts, in which she was engaged as a member of the editorial board of the Serbian Encyclopedia, the president of the Board for Folk Literature, and a member of the Administrative Board of the Endowment of Branko Ćopić. She published many works in the field of folk literature.

References

External links
 "The oral tradition", a text by Nada Milošević-Đorđević translated into English on Project Rastko.

1934 births
2021 deaths
People from Belgrade
Academic staff of the University of Belgrade
University of Belgrade Faculty of Philology alumni
20th-century Serbian historians
Serbian literary historians